Surreal is the debut album from UK alternative rock band Man Raze. The album was written over a two-year period from 2004-2006 and recorded during April 2006 in Dublin in only two weeks. It features the singles "Skin Crawl" and "Turn It Up". The album was released in the USA on June 3, 2008. The UK Edition featuring a 5 track bonus disc is available from December 1, 2008.

Track listing
"This Is" – 2:33
"Turn It Up" – 2:12
"Runnin' Me Up" – 4:06
"Every Second Of Every Day" – 4:00
"Spinning Out" – 3:22
"Can't Find My Own Way" – 3:11
"Skin Crawl" – 3:53
"Low" – 3:49
"Connected To You" – 2:39
"Halo" – 2:57
"It's Entertainment" – 2:33
"Shadow Man" – 4:16
"Turn It Up (Dub)" – 5:06 (US iTunes Bonus Track)

UK/European Bonus Disc
"You're So Wrong"
"Low (Live In Burbank '08)"
"Turn It Up (Deep Dub)"
"Runnin' Me Up (Instrumental Dub)"
"Can't Find My Own Way (Live Acoustic)"

Personnel
 Phil Collen: Lead Vocals, Guitar, Background Vocals
 Simon Laffy: Bass Guitar, Background Vocals
 Paul Cook: Drums, Background Vocals

Production credits
 Phil Collen: Engineer
 Simon Laffy: Programming, Engineer
 Bob Ludwig: Mastering
 Ger McDonnell: Producer, Engineer
 Laurence Brazil: Engineer
 Richard Proctor: Artwork
 Shannon Toumey: Packaging Manager

References 

2008 debut albums
Man Raze albums